Jung Seung-gi (Hangul: 정승기; born 27 March 1999) is a South korean skeleton racer. Jung finished in ninth place in the men's skeleton at the 2019 IBSF World Championships in Whistler, and won a gold medal at the 2018 Intercontinental Cup in Winterberg. He won a bronze medal at the 2023 IBSF World Championships for the first time since Yun Sungbin’s bronze medal back in 2019.

Early life and education 
Jung was born on March 27, 1999 in Paju, Gyeonggi-do. In 2014, he was first introduced to the world of Skeleton sport. In 2018, Jung was one of the young Korean athletes who carried the Olympic Flag into the Olympic Stadium at the Opening Ceremony of the 2018 Winter Olympics in Pyeongchang. In 2023, Jung graduated from Catholic Kwandong University with a Bachelor's degree on Sports Rehabilitation.

Competitive Highlights

Olympic Games

World Championships

Skeleton World Cup

References

External links

1999 births
Living people
South Korean male skeleton racers
People from Paju
Skeleton racers at the 2016 Winter Youth Olympics
Skeleton racers at the 2022 Winter Olympics
Olympic skeleton racers of South Korea
Sportspeople from Gyeonggi Province
21st-century South Korean people